Katapola is a small port village on the Greek island of Amorgos, the easternmost island of the Cyclades. It is located at the foot of a hill which was once the site of the ancient town of Minoa, believed to be a summer palace of the mythological King Minos. The port can be reached by an eight-hour ferry journey from Athens. The population of Katapola municipal district was 595 as of the 2011 census.

References 

Populated places in Naxos (regional unit)
Amorgos